This is an incomplete list of software that reads S.M.A.R.T. (Self-Monitoring, Analysis, and Reporting Technology) data from hard drives.

Notes

References 

S.M.A.R.T. Tools
Computer storage technologies
Hard disk software